COSAFA U-20 Women's Championship is a football tournament for under-20 women's teams from southern Africa organized by Council of Southern Africa Football Associations (COSAFA). The first edition of the tournament was held in South Africa in 2019 with guest nation Tanzania coming out as champions. The 2020 tournament was canceled due to COVID-19 pandemic.

Results

G: Invited guest team, no COSAFA member.

Awards

References

External links
Official website

COSAFA competitions
Under-20 association football